Steffi Graf defeated Arantxa Sánchez Vicario in the final, 6–1, 6–4, 3–6, 6–1 to win the singles tennis title at the 1993 Virginia Slims Championships.

Monica Seles was the three-time defending champion, but did not participate this year due to her stabbing that April.

Seeds

Note
  Monica Seles had qualified but withdrew due to back stab received during Hamburg tournament
  Jennifer Capriati had qualified but withdrew due to temporal break from competitive tennis

Draw

Finals
 NB: The final was the best of 5 sets while all other rounds were the best of 3 sets.

See also
WTA Tour Championships appearances

References

External links
 Official results archive (ITF)
 Official results archive (WTA)

Singles 1993
1993 WTA Tour